In Greek mythology, Geren (Ancient Greek: Γέρηνος Gerēn) was the eponym of the town of Geren in Lesbos. He was the son of Poseidon.

Note

References 
 Stephanus of Byzantium, Stephani Byzantii Ethnicorum quae supersunt, edited by August Meineike (1790-1870), published 1849. A few entries from this important ancient handbook of place names have been translated by Brady Kiesling. Online version at the Topos Text Project.

Children of Poseidon
Demigods in classical mythology